Stockbrook or Stock Brook may refer to:

 Stockbrook, Derby, an area of Derby, England
 Stockbrook Park, a public park in California, Derby, England
 Stock Brook, an area of Chadderton, Oldham, England, named after a stream
 Stockbrook Mill, a mill in Oldham, England
 Stockbrook, a fictional river in the Shire, a region in the works of J. R. R. Tolkien.

See also
 Stockbook
 Stockbroker